A Globar is used as a thermal light source for infrared spectroscopy. The preferred material for making Globar is silicon carbide that is shaped as rods or arches of various sizes. When inserted into a circuit that provides it with electric current, it emits radiation from ~ 2 to 50 micrometres wavelength via the Joule heating phenomenon. Globars are used as infrared sources for spectroscopy because their spectral behavior corresponds approximately to that of a Planck radiator (i.e. a black body). Alternative infrared sources are Nernst lamps, coils of chrome–nickel alloy or high-pressure mercury lamps.

The technical term Globar is an English portmanteau word consisting of glow and bar. The term glowbar is sometimes used synonymously in English (which is an incorrect spelling in the strict sense).

The American Resistor Company in Milwaukee, Wisconsin, had word and lettering Globar registered as a trademark (in a special decorative script font) with the United States Patent and Trademark Office on June 30, 1925 (registration number 0200201) and on October 18, 1927 (registration number 0234147). This registration had been renewed for the third time in 1987 (by various companies throughout 60 years).

See also 
 Nernst lamp
 List of light sources

External links 
 Viewgraphs about infrared beamlines and IR spectroscopy Advanced Light Source, Berkeley, CA, USA
 Introduction to the optical principles of IR spectroscopy, light sources Ralf Arnold (in German)

Lighting
Spectroscopy